Indigenous treaties in Australia consist of proposed or historic legal documents defining the relationship between Indigenous Australians (that is, Aboriginal Australians and Torres Strait Islanders) and the Government of Australia or the government of an Australian state or territory. , there are no such treaties in force.

There have been some moves made at state and territory level to develop a treaty process, boosted by the Victorian Government's establishment of a legal framework for negotiations to progress, announced in 2016 and with the election of the First Peoples' Assembly in 2019. Support shown for Indigenous issues by the June 2020 Black Lives Matter rallies across Australia has also provided an impetus for progress on the matter.

Background
The objects of treaties between governments and Indigenous peoples may include: 

 provision of practical rights and compensation
 initiation of a formal process of  reconciliation between the group and government relating to past grievances
 providing a framework for some type of  self-determination for individual peoples or groups

Research by the Harvard Project on American Indian Economic Development shows that self-determination is an essential component in redressing entrenched disadvantage.

Many Aboriginal Australians have said that a treaty or treaties would bring them real as well as symbolic recognition, and national debate has occurred for many years on the topic, alongside related matters such as Indigenous recognition in the Australian Constitution, land rights, and programs aimed at reducing disadvantage such as Closing the Gap. The type of treaty envisaged would involve a formal agreement which defines the relationship between government and First Nations peoples, and could include binding contracts on specific issues as well as practical measures relating to health and education.

British colonial representatives negotiated treaties with local Indigenous peoples in New Zealand and in Canada during early phases of settlement. The Treaty of Waitangi was concluded in 1840 at time when the future Colony of New Zealand was then part of the Colony of New South Wales. British treaty-making in North America began as early as sixteenth century and continued until Canada gained self-government in 1867, after which time the Canadian federal government entered into the Numbered Treaties (1871 to 1921).  Colonial treaties also featured in African history: a chief of Bonny (in present-day Nigeria) in 1860 explained that he refused a British treaty due to the tendency to "induce the Chiefs to sign a treaty whose meaning they did not understand, and then seize upon the country". The sale of "Lüderitzland" in present-day Namibia to Adolf Lüderitz in 1883 provides an example of a misunderstood treaty.

History
The concept of a treaty goes back to the early years of the Australian colonies. In 1832 the Governor of Van Diemen’s Land (now Tasmania), George Arthur remarked in the aftermath of the Black War in the colony that it was “a fatal error...that a treaty was not entered into with the natives". He recommended to the Colonial Office that, before the colonisation of South Australia, an understanding be reached with the Aboriginal peoples there, in a bid "to prevent a long-continued warfare". Notably, the Letters Patent establishing the Province of South Australia of 1836 (unlike the South Australia Act 1834, which it amended), included recognition of the rights of the Aboriginal peoples of South Australia.

The only pre-21st century attempt to negotiate a treaty with Indigenous Australians was what came to be known as Batman's Treaty. This was an agreement between John Batman, a pastoralist and businessman, and a group of Wurundjeri elders, for the purchase of land around Port Phillip, near the present site of Melbourne The so-called treaty was declared void on 26 August 1835 by the Governor of New South Wales, Richard Bourke, which asserted that all land within the colony belonged to the Crown and that it had the sole authority to dispose of it.

An Indigenous treaty was first promised by Prime Minister Bob Hawke in 1988 after receiving the Barunga Statement from Aboriginal elders, which called for such a treaty to be concluded. Despite public interest and growing support, concerns were raised over possible implications of such a treaty, such as financial compensation.

21st century
In 2017, Prime Minister Malcolm Turnbull rejected calls for an Indigenous voice to parliament, an advisory body which would be enshrined in the Constitution that could lead to a treaty.

With no progress made towards an Indigenous treaty at federal level (despite decades of debate), in the early 21st century a number of states and territories began treaty negotiations with their Indigenous peoples. The 2017 Uluru Statement from the Heart included the request: "We seek a Makarrata Commission to supervise a process of agreement-making between governments and First Nations and truth-telling about our history" (Makarrata being a Yolngu word for "a process of conflict resolution, peacemaking and justice").

In July 2019, Ken Wyatt, recently appointed to the new role of Minister for Indigenous Australians, gave an address to the National Press Club, in which he spoke of the theme of NAIDOC Week 2019: "Voice. Treaty. Truth.". He spoke of the development of a local, regional and national voice, and said "with respect to Treaty, it's important that states and territory jurisdictions take the lead. When you consider the constitution, they are better placed to undertake that work".

With the Victorian Government's creation of a legal framework for Indigenous treaty negotiations in 2018 with their First Peoples' Assembly, the debate rose to prominence across Australia again, with impetus added by the June 2020 Black Lives Matter rallies across Australia.

, there are no treaties between the federal or any state government in Australia in force.

State and territory treaty processes
The Victorian Government of Daniel Andrews was the first at state level to pass a legal framework for Indigenous treaty negotiations, in 2018, but there have been various moves made to instigate such a process in all states and territories in the 21st century.

Issues covered by an Indigenous treaty with a state government are likely to include health and education.

Northern Territory
In 2018 the Northern Territory Government of Michael Gunner pledged to undertake a treaty process with Indigenous peoples of the Territory, including the appointment of an Independent Treaty Commissioner to oversee negotiations. In June 2018 Gunner signed the "Barunga agreement", a memorandum of understanding committing his Government to negotiate with the Territory's four Aboriginal land councils over the next three years to develop a treaty process.

The process will be overseen by an independent treaty commissioner, who in the first stage will undertake consultations for one year with the Indigenous communities to gauge their interest in a treaty.  In the second stage, a public discussion paper will be released, translated into major Aboriginal languages for consultation and feedback. A final report will then be tabled in the Northern Territory Legislative Assembly within 18 months of stage one's completion.

On 4 March 2019, Mick Dodson was appointed Treaty Commissioner, agreed by all four NT land councils and the Minister. He is tasked with presenting a final report within 2.5 years. The Treaty Commission, in a discussion paper published in July 2020, has said: "Some of our Elders are very old … the process of truth-telling must begin as soon as possible. It is urgent". Truth-telling is an essential step, and must take place before the negotiations for treaty get under way, which can take a long time. Because the NT is not a state, treaties negotiated with the NT Government could be overruled by the Federal Government, thereby limiting their effectiveness. There are also challenges in cases where traditional owners' lands extend across state borders, and where members and descendants of the Stolen Generations have not been able to find who their people are and therefore may not qualify as First Nations people. The Treaty Commissioner would be handing his report to the Chief Minister in 2022, after which negotiations would begin.

Queensland
In 2019 the Queensland Government of Annastacia Palaszczuk announced its interest in pursuing a pathway to an Indigenous treaty process. The Treaty Working Group and Eminent Treaty Process Panel were set up, with Jackie Huggins and Michael Lavarch co-chairing the Eminent Panel. Their Path to Treaty Report was tabled in Queensland Parliament in February 2020 after they had consulted widely, across more than 1,700 Queenslanders and 24 communities between July 2019 and early 2020, and presented to Deputy Premier, Treasurer and Minister for Aboriginal and Torres Strait Islander Partnerships Jackie Trad. Huggins said that a process of truth-telling, acknowledging the history of Australia, is a "vital component to moving on".

On 13 August 2020, Premier Palaszczuk announced that the Government would be supporting the recommendation to move forward on a Path to Treaty with First Nations Queenslanders. She said that the Treaty Advancement Committee would provide independent advice on the implementation of the panel’s recommendations.

South Australia
In 2016 the South Australian Government of Jay Weatherill announced its intention to negotiate treaties with Indigenous groups across the state, announcing that $4.4 million was set aside over five years for the purpose, to establish up to 40 treaties across the state. In December 2016, talks began between the government and three Aboriginal nations: the Ngarrindjeri, Narungga and Adnyamathanha peoples. Following the July 2017 report of the South Australian Treaty Commissioner, negotiations began. In February 2018, the Buthera Agreement was signed with the Narungga nation, of the Yorke Peninsula.

Following the Weatherill government's defeat in the 2018 state election, incoming premier Steven Marshall paused the treaty negotiation process that had been begun by his predecessor, Jay Weatherill, stating he wanted to focus on "practical outcomes".

Tasmania
On Australia Day in 2015, the Tasmanian Greens called for a formal treaty to be negotiated between the Tasmanian Government and the Tasmanian Aboriginal community. Michael Mansell, chair of the Aboriginal Land Council of Tasmania, said in August 2019 that non-Indigenous people need not fear a treaty, as it would "simply be an expression of true democracy and self-determination". He said that returning a few key areas of uninhabited wilderness which was now Crown land would mean jobs for Aboriginal people.

In June 2020, Mansell and Greg Brown, Tasmanian Aboriginal Corporation board member, had their first meeting with Premier Peter Gutwein, and raised the matter of a treaty. Mansell had been heartened by the support shown for Aboriginal issues across Australia in the Black Lives Matter protests sparked by the death of US man George Floyd, and spoke at the Launceston rally of the need for a Treaty Commission.

Victoria

The Victorian Government was the first at state level to pass a legal framework for Indigenous treaty negotiations, in 2018. The Victorian Liberal Party opposed a state-based Indigenous treaty, stating that a federal treaty would be more appropriate. Opposition politician Bernie Finn also stated that since Aboriginal Victorians were Victorian citizens, the state would be making an Indigenous treaty with itself, an argument rejected by the Government.

On 3 July 2018, the government passed the first Australian treaty law ever, the Advancing the Treaty Process with Aboriginal Victorians Act 2018, effective 1 August 2018. The ultimate goal of a partnership between the Victorian Government and Aboriginal communities "is to achieve reconciliation and justice for Aboriginal communities", and the Act enshrines such a partnership in law.

The 2019 Victorian First Peoples' Assembly election was held to choose the representatives for Aboriginal and Torres Strait Islander people in Victoria.

Yoorrook

In July 2020, the Victorian government became the first state or territory to commit to the creation of a truth and justice commission to "formally recognise historical wrongs and ongoing injustices" against Aboriginal people. The commission was named the Yoorrook Justice Commission, and aims to establish an official public record of the experience of Aboriginal Victorians since the start of British colonisation in Victoria. It will examine past and ongoing injustices to the First People of Victoria resulting from colonisation, providing provide a culturally safe place in which First People and others can tell the truth about traumatic events that have happened and their effects, to identify systemic injustice in Victoria and propose reforms to end that injustice and to propose matters that might be included in Victoria’s ongoing treaty-making processes. Its findings, scheduled to be reported by June 2024, will include recommendations for reform and redress, and will inform Victoria's Treaty negotiations. 

Justice Kevin Bell was appointed as the only non-Aboriginal Commissioner; the others are:
Professor Eleanor Bourke, Chairperson
 Dr Wayne Atkinson
Kevin Bell (the only non-Aboriginal commissioner) 
 Sue-Anne Hunter
Distinguished Professor Maggie Walter

Uncle Jack Charles was the first Indigenous elder to speak about his experiences at the first set of public hearings, or wurrek tyerrang, in April 2021. A second block of hearings was scheduled for late May. Elders were invited to speak about their direct experiences and perspectives, based on their preparedness to tell their truths in a public setting. Others would be able to share their stories in submissions, or nuther-mooyoop, in writing, audio or video form, or as an object such as an artwork.

Western Australia
In 2015 the Western Australian Government of Colin Barnett signed a  native title settlement with the Noongar people, which was described by deputy opposition leader Roger Cook as "a classic treaty", and Ken Wyatt called it "a treaty in the true sense".

It has been described as "Australia's first treaty".

By 2018, WA had announced plans to establish an Aboriginal representative body in the state.

See also
Aboriginal land rights in Australia
History of Indigenous Australians
Letters Patent establishing the Province of South Australia
Native title in Australia
Treaty rights

References

Further reading

I
T
T
A